DYAB (1512 AM) Radyo Patrol was a radio station owned and operated by ABS-CBN Corporation. The station's studio and office were located at the ABS-CBN Broadcasting Complex, North Road, Brgy. Jagobiao, Mandaue, while its transmitter was located at Brgy. Cogon Pardo, Cebu City. DYAB originally operated on a 24-hour, 7-day schedule from its inception in 1995.

Similar to Manila-based DZMM, DYAB also had a television channel on Sky Cable named DYAB TeleRadyo Cebu where the studio and hosts of its programs can be seen by its listeners and viewers. Selected programs of DZMM were also aired on the station.

On May 5, 2020, the station suspended its broadcasting activities, following the cease-and-desist order issued by the National Telecommunications Commission due to the expiration of ABS-CBN's legislative license to operate. On May 8, 2020, most of its programming resumed via online feed and through TeleRadyo Cebu. On August 28, 2020, TeleRadyo Cebu signed off for the last time. The hosts and staff of the station launched Sibya TV on September 1, 2020.

Notable anchors
Leo Lastimosa
June Perez
Ferdinand Mañus
RC Dalaguit
Angie Saniel
Jenny Rica Vidad
Jeffrey Astillo
Atty. John Dx Lapid
Atty. JT Benz
Atty. Joselito "Boy"Alo
Atty. Galicano "Jun"Arriesgado Jr.
Atty. Pat Acabodillo
Atty. Ina Magpale
Rhea Soco
Edison delos Angeles
Najib Cubio
Juve Villar
Bob Malazarte
Dave Tumulak
Edgar Escalante
Edgar Gutierrez
Jun Tariman
Marlon Bellita

References

DYAB
DYAB
News and talk radio stations in the Philippines
Radyo Patrol stations
Radio stations disestablished in 2020
Defunct radio stations in the Philippines